Calcutta East was a constituency of the Lok Sabha (Lower House of the Parliament of India), located in the city of Calcutta, West Bengal. It was used in the 1957 Indian general election and 1962 Indian general election. As of 1957, the constituency had 497,202 eligible voters. In 1962 it had 471,011 electors. In 1967 it was replaced by the Calcutta South constituency.

Members of Parliament
1957: Sadhan Gupta (Communist Party of India)
1962: Ranendranath Sen (Communist Party of India)

References

Former constituencies of the Lok Sabha
1957 establishments in West Bengal
1967 disestablishments in India
Constituencies established in 1957
Constituencies disestablished in 1967
Former Lok Sabha constituencies of West Bengal